Dolen may refer to:

Places 
 Dolen, Blagoevgrad Province, a village in the Satovcha Municipality of Blagoevgrad Province, Bulgaria
 Dolen, Smolyan Province, a village in the Zlatograd municipality of Smolyan Province, Bulgaria
 Dolen, Texas, United States
 Dolen Peak, Antarctica
 Dolen Omurzakov Stadium, stadium in Bishkek, Kyrgyzstan

People 
  (born 1988), Norwegian artistic gymnast
 Dolen Perkins-Valdez, American writer

See also
 Alma Dolens (1876–1948), pseudonym of Teresita Pasini
 Dølen, Norwegian weekly literary magazine published between 1858 and 1870
 Dolenz, people with that surname
 Dolan (disambiguation)
 Dolin (disambiguation)